Frank Day Truesdale (March 31, 1884 – August 27, 1943) was an American second baseman in Major League Baseball who played from  through  for the St. Louis Browns (1910–1911), New York Yankees (1914) and Boston Red Sox (1918). He was born in St. Louis, Missouri.

In a four season career, Truesdale was a .220 hitter (147-for-668) with one home run and 40 RBI in 216 games, including 68 runs, 12 doubles, two triples, 41 stolen bases, and a .318 on-base percentage.

He was a member of the 1918 American League champion Red Sox, although he did not play in the World Series.

Truesdale died at the age of 59 in Albuquerque, New Mexico.

External links

Retrosheet

1884 births
1943 deaths
Major League Baseball second basemen
St. Louis Browns players
New York Yankees players
Boston Red Sox players
Houston Buffaloes players
Oakland Oaks (baseball) players
Dallas Giants players
Buffalo Bisons (minor league) players
Jersey City Skeeters players
Toronto Maple Leafs (International League) players
Dallas Marines players
San Antonio Bronchos players
Paris Snappers players
Ardmore Producers players
Baseball players from St. Louis